Taʻū is the largest island in the Manuʻa Islands and the easternmost volcanic island of the Samoan Islands. Taū is part of American Samoa. In the early 19th century, the island was sometimes called Opoun.

Taū is well known as the site where the American anthropologist Margaret Mead conducted her dissertation research in Samoa in the 1920s, after which she published her findings in a work titled Coming of Age in Samoa.

On the western coast of Taū are the conterminous villages of Lumā and Siufaga, usually referred to jointly as Taū village. The village of Taū has been named the capital of the Manuʻa Islands. Fitiuta is another Taū village, located on the northeast side of the island.

Geography
The island is the eroded remnant of a hotspot shield volcano with a caldera complex or collapse feature (Liu Bench) on the south face. The last known volcanic eruption in the Manua Islands was in 1866, on the mid-ocean ridge that extends west-northwest towards nearby Ofu-Olosega.

The largest airport in the Manua Islands is on the northeast corner of Taū at Fitiuta. There is also a private airport. A boat harbor is located at Faleāsao at the northwestern corner of the island. A roadway along the north coast connects all of the several inhabited villages between Taū on the west and Fitiuta.

All of the southeastern half of Taū—including all of the rainforest on top of Lata Mountain and within the caldera—the southern shoreline, and associated coral reefs are part of the National Park of American Samoa. The park includes the ancient, sacred site of Saua, considered to be the birthplace of the Polynesian people.

Administratively, the island is divided into three counties: Faleāsao County, Fitiʻuta County, and Taʻū County. Along with the Ofu and Olosega Islands, Taū Island comprises the Manuʻa District of American Samoa.

In 2000, a subsea volcano  from Taū Island was discovered by scientists.

Anthropological research

Taū is where the 23-year-old anthropologist Margaret Mead conducted her dissertation research in Samoa in the 1920s, published in 1928 as Coming of Age in Samoa. In her work, she studied adolescent girls and compared their experience to those of Western societies. She concluded that adolescence was a smooth transition, not marked by the emotional or psychological distress, anxiety, or confusion seen in the United States.

Electricity
Until 2016, being a small and isolated island, the island relied on costly and polluting diesel generators to supply electricity. However, with the construction of a solar array, battery storage system, and microgrid, the island's power relies almost 100% from the sun.  The solar array was built by SolarCity and now includes sixty Tesla Powerpacks. The system should be a more reliable source of energy and was designed to power the entire island for three days without sunlight and fully recharge in seven hours.

References

External links
 Tau Island: Faleasao, Fitiuta, and Ta'u counties, Manu'a District, United States Census Bureau

Mountains of American Samoa
Islands of American Samoa
Volcanoes of American Samoa
Polygenetic shield volcanoes
Manu'a